is a Fukui Railway Fukubu Line railway station located in the city of Echizen, Fukui Prefecture, Japan.

Lines

Station layout
The station consists of one ground-level island platform connected to the wooden station building by a level crossing. The station is unattended.

Adjacent stations

History
The station opened on February 23, 1924

Surrounding area
The station is located on the east bank of the Yoshinose River and serves a predominantly residential area. Takefu Commercial High School is also nearby.

See also
 List of railway stations in Japan

External links

  

Railway stations in Fukui Prefecture
Railway stations in Japan opened in 1924
Fukui Railway Fukubu Line
Echizen, Fukui